Waltham Forest Guardian now known as Your Local Guardian, is a weekly local newspaper sold every Thursday in the London boroughs of Waltham Forest and Redbridge.

The newspaper's weekly circulation is 2,508 copies, according to ABC figures for July to December 2017.

The paper is part of the Guardian Series of local newspapers, which also included the Chingford Guardian, Wanstead and Woodford Guardian, and the Epping Forest Guardian.

The group is owned by Newsquest, which also prints dozens of local and regional papers across the UK.

History

Early days
The newspaper was founded in 1876 under the name The Walthamstow and Leyton Guardian.

In 1935 the Walthamstow Guardian opened new headquarters in Forest Road.

The newspaper group merged with the Epping Gazette series in 1942.

In 1978 the company moved to new headquarters in Forest Road, Walthamstow. Production later moved to an office in Larkshall Road, Highams Park.

Relocation from Waltham Forest
In 2009 production of the newspaper moved out of Waltham Forest for the first time in its history, with staff relocating to an office in nearby Epping in Essex. The newspaper subsequently relocated again to a Newsquest office in Watford.

In May 2015 Newsquest announced it was moving some of the newspaper's production to a 'subbing hub' in Weymouth, Dorset. The publisher said the move was an investment in the 'installation of a new editorial system to improve operational efficiency within the business and save costs'.

But just over a year later, in August 2016, the move was dubbed a 'failed experiment' by the National Union of Journalists after Newsquest announced it was cutting 19 jobs at the Weymouth site and again moving production of its newspapers back to local regions. The Weymouth office was then closed in June 2017.

Rebranding
In September 2018 the newspaper was rebranded as Your Local Guardian, the result of a merger between the Chingford, Wanstead and Woodford and Waltham Forest editions.

Editors 
 Peter Dyke 2000s
 Pat Stannard (Wanstead and Woodford) 2000s - 2008
 Amanda Patterson (group editor) 2007 - 2012 
 Anthony Longden (editorial director) 2008 - 2012
 Tim Jones (group editor) 2012 - 2017
 Victoria Birch (group editor) 2017–present

References

External links 
 Waltham Forest Guardian
 www.facebook.com/newsguardianseries

Media and communications in the London Borough of Waltham Forest
London newspapers